Kuzmichyov is a surname. Notable people with the name include:
 Aleksandr Kuzmichyov (born 1971), Russian professional footballer
 Ilya Kuzmichyov (born 1988), Russian professional football player
 Ivan Kuzmichyov (born 2000), Russian football player
 Viktor Kuzmichyov (born 1992), Russian professional football player
 Vladimir Kuzmichyov (1979–2016), Russian footballer